Elections to regional councils in the Czech Republic in 13 regions (except Prague) were held on 2–3 October 2020.

Background
ANO 2011 won the previous election. Czech Social Democratic Party saw heavy losses and came second. 2017 Czech legislative election resulted in another victory of ANO 2011 while Social Democrats were reduced to 6th place. Traditional main right wing party Civic Democratic Party finished second followed by Czech Pirate Party and Freedom and Direct Democracy. Civic Democrats and Pirates has since then competed for the position of the main opposition party.

TOP 09 and Mayors and Independents negotiated about possible electoral alliance, but in December 2019, negotiations failed and parties decided to cooperate only in some regions. In February 2020 the Civic Democratic Party and TOP 09 in Plzeň region agreed to cooperate in Plzeň region allowing TOP 09 candidates to run on the Civic Democratic Party list. Similar agreements were made in Pardubice Region and Moravian-Silesian Region in which ODS allowed TOP 09 to run on its list. ODS also formed an electoral alliance with KDU-ČSL in Karlovy Vary Region and with STAN and Eastern Bohemians in Hradec Králové Region.

Czech Pirate Party formed  an electoral alliance with Mayors an Independents for Olomouc region in March 2020. The Pirate Party decided to not form any other regional electoral alliance .

Tricolour Citizens' Movement formed coalitions with Svobodní and Freeholder Party of the Czech Republic in most regions. It is the first election for the Party that formed in 2019.

Election lists were to be submitted no later than on 28 July 2020. 207 lists were submitted with largest portion in Moravian-Silesian Region and South Bohemian Region.

COVID-19 pandemic

Election would be held during COVID-19 pandemic. In July 2020 it was reported that people in quarantine would be unable to vote. Opposition parties largely criticised that people would be limited on their right to vote. This led government to prepare laws to enable quarantined people to vote. It introduced 4 possibilities - drive-through voting, voting through a representative, or a special electoral commission that would come to affected people and formation of special electoral districts. Minister of Interior and leader of ČSSD stated that Parliament should accept all possibilities. TOP 09, STAN and Pirates only decided to support Drive-through voting and special electoral districts. ODS decided to support Drive-through voting, special electoral commissions but opposed the possibility of voting through a representative.

Campaign

ANO 2011
The party is running alone in all regions. The party decided to put many MPs on its lists. ANO is viewed as the front-runner. It has 5 Governors and the highest number of seats in regional councils. According to a poll conducted for ANO 2011, the party would win in most regions with Central Bohemia and Liberec region as the only regions in which ANO wouldn't win.

The party launched its Campaign on 3 September 2020 with the slogans "Shown applies" and "Actions instead of Words." Party hopes that the voters will appreciate its previous work.

Civic Democratic Party (ODS)
Martin Kupka became electoral manager of ODS for regional elections. He is also running for the position of the Governor of the Central Bohemian District. Other Governor Candidates include Martin Červíček former Police President, Martin Kuba and Jiří Nantl. ODS is running with other smaller parties in some regions. Kupka admitted that the Campaign of ODS is influenced by the 2020 coronavirus outbreak in the Czech Republic as restrictions delayed launch of the Campaign and cause it to be focused more on Social media.

ODS launched its campaign on 24 June 2020 with the slogan "Let's put Czechia back on its feet."

Czech Pirate Party (Piráti)
The Czech Pirate Party launched their campaign on 22 June 2020. It runs under the slogan "Chance to change the Future." The party is running without cooperation with other Parties. Only in Olomouc region are the Pirates running in a coalition with Mayors and Independents.

Czech Social Democratic Party (ČSSD)
Michal Hašek became the electoral manager of ČSSD on 23 April 2020. He was chosen by the leader of the Party Jan Hamáček. Party holds Governor seats in 5 of 12 regions. Ivana Stráská, Jiří Běhounek, Martin Netolický and Jiří Štěpán seek reelection while Josef Bernard decided to not run for another term as a Candidate of ČSSD and instead runs as a Candidate of STAN. The Party decided to form electoral coalitions in regions to mitigate expected losses. According to a poll conducted by ČSSD the party would fail to cross the 5% threshold in 10 of 13 regions. ČSSD formed electoral alliances in Pardubice, Hradec Králové, Moravian-Silesian and Ústí nad Labem regions. The party also has to face challenges from parties that split from the party including Change 2020 led by Jiří Zimola in South Bohemia, Idealists.cz in South Moravia and other regions.

ČSSD launched its campaign on 26 June 2020. The campaign was launched via digital streaming due to 2020 coronavirus outbreak. The campaign uses slogan "People First, campaign later."

On 4 July 2020 the social democratic leadership rejected an electoral alliance with smaller parties in Ústí nad Labem region called Better North. Leaders of regional organisation stated, that despite the decision of the party's leadership they plan to continue with the project. They stated that the party leadership didn't tell reasons for the decision. This led to a split when party leadership decided to submit its own list in Ústí nad Labem region without consulting Ústí nad Labem branch of the ČSSD. Candidates on the list included former MP Jaroslav Krákora or controversial politician Petr Benda who previously ran as a candidate of National Socialists - Left of the 21st century and Workers' Party of Social Justice (DSSS). This list is supported by the For Sport movement. Leader of Ústí nad Labem regional organisation Miroslav Andrt stated that it was an unimaginable leadership in Prague that ignored democratic principles in the party. Regional organisation decided to submit its list Better North to run against ČSSD in the region and ČSSD members on the list suspended their membership in the party. Nomination of Petr Benda was largely criticised due to his previous affiliation with Neo-Nazi DSSS.

Freedom and Direct Democracy (SPD)
Freedom and Direct Democracy aims to win 50 seats and participate in governing of at least 2 regions. Election motto is "Honest and working people first and must get more money, safety and justice." Campaign was launched on 11 July 2020.

Mayors and Independents (STAN)
STAN launched its campaign on 31 August 2020 using garlic as a representation of its campaign, noting that garlic has a healing ability. Party leader Vít Rakušan stated, that he believes that Regions need to regenerate.

TOP 09
TOP 09 campaign uses the slogan "Let's move with it." The party decided to form electoral coalitions with other parties in every region.

Tricolour Citizens' Movement (THO)
Tricolour Citizens' Movement runs for its first major election. The party formed coalitions with Freeholder Party of the Czech Republic, Svobodní and INDEPENDENTS. Leaders of the party plan to ride through the country in a van to campaign for the party.

Opinion polls

Kantar Polls for Czech Television 

Note: Election potential

Results

Total results

Regions

Notes

References 

Regional elections in the Czech Republic
2020 elections in the Czech Republic
2020 in the Czech Republic
October 2020 events in the Czech Republic